Conrad Tockler (1470–1530) is best known for being a writer, physician, and professor.

Biography 
The works and teachings of Tockler mainly focus on medicine, mathematics, and astrology. He began his academic journey at Leipzig University where he obtained a masters degree in 1502. He continued his education at Leipzig to earn a medical degree in 1510. His journey at Leipzig was over as a student, but he accepted a job as a professor which would lead to him spending the rest of his life there. Conrad lectured almost every semester during the time between earning his masters and Medical degree.

Academia
During those years his lectures were on quadrivium which is a mixture of four disciplines: geometry, music, astronomy, and arithmetic. While being a professor at Leipzig, he also worked with the near by print shops. The relationship with the print shops started out by him working to get his students textbooks. It then turned into Tockler's commentaries being added on to scholarly books being printed at that time. His first commented reprint was  Libellus de sole, which was originally done by Marsilius Ficinus. He then made two different commented reprints of Tractatus de sphaera by Johannes de Sacrobosco. This led to two of his own completely original works getting published. The two works were both about the rules of using table and circular diagrams to depict operations related to the calendars. This was a big achievement for Tockler due to the fact that Leipzig was one of the major printing locations of this time. The publication of his work related to the rules of using visual aids to depict calendrical events, leading to Tockler publishing his own annual calendar. After his works started getting published at Leipzig, his home town print shops in Nuremberg started to also make copies of his calendars. Nuremberg, like Leipzig was also a locational hotspot for print shops. Due to his success he was appointed Rector magnificus of Leipzig University in 1512, which is the highest position at a German university. This is equivalent to the President of a University in the United States. Although it seemed like everything was going perfectly for Tockler, he had a dark secret that would eventually catch up to him. In 1518, he was forced to resign due to apparent drug abuse. This was not the end of his career at Leipzig University due to the fact that he had favorable relationships with Duke George of Saxony. He would never return to the prestigious rank of Rector magnificus, but he would be able to return as a professor with the backing of Duke George of Saxony. He would stay at the position of professor at Leipzig University until his death in 1530. He did not have any living inheritor to take possession of his wealth or belongings. Due to that Duke George took control of his assets and used them to open up the third chair for medicine at Leipzig University. The third chair was named Tockleriana in remembrance of the late professor until the eighteenth century.

References 

1470 births
1530 deaths
People from Nuremberg
Wikipedia Student Program